Yahoo! (styled yahoo! in its logo) is an American web services provider. It is headquartered in Sunnyvale, California and operated by the namesake company Yahoo! Inc., which is 90% owned by investment funds managed by Apollo Global Management and 10% by Verizon Communications.

It provides a web portal, search engine Yahoo Search, and related services, including My Yahoo!, Yahoo Mail, Yahoo News, Yahoo Finance, Yahoo Sports and its advertising platform, Yahoo! Native.

Yahoo was established by Jerry Yang and David Filo in January 1994 and was one of the pioneers of the early Internet era in the 1990s. However, usage declined in the late 2000s as some services discontinued and it lost market share to Facebook and Google.

History

Founding

In January 1994, Yang and Filo were electrical engineering graduate students at Stanford University, when they created a website named "Jerry and David's guide to the World Wide Web". The site was a human-edited web directory, organized in a hierarchy, as opposed to a searchable index of pages. In March 1994, "Jerry and David's Guide to the World Wide Web" was renamed "Yahoo!" and became known as the Yahoo Directory. The "yahoo.com" domain was registered on January 18, 1995.

The word "yahoo" is a backronym for "Yet Another Hierarchically Organized Oracle" or "Yet Another Hierarchical Officious Oracle". The term "hierarchical" described how the Yahoo database was arranged in layers of subcategories. The term "oracle" was intended to mean "source of truth and wisdom", and the term "officious", rather than being related to the word's normal meaning, described the many office workers who would use the Yahoo database while surfing from work. However, Filo and Yang insist they mainly selected the name because they liked the slang definition of a "yahoo" (used by college students in David Filo's native Louisiana in the late 1980s and early 1990s to refer to an unsophisticated, rural Southerner): "rude, unsophisticated, uncouth." This meaning derives from the Yahoo race of fictional beings from Gulliver's Travels.

Yahoo was incorporated on March 2, 1995. In 1995, a search engine function, called Yahoo Search, was introduced. This allowed users to search Yahoo Directory. Yahoo soon became the first popular online directory and search engine on the World Wide Web.

Expansion

Yahoo grew rapidly throughout the 1990s. Yahoo became a public company via an initial public offering in April 1996 and its stock price rose 600% within two years. Like many search engines and web directories, Yahoo added a web portal, putting it in competition with services including Excite, Lycos, and America Online. By 1998, Yahoo was the most popular starting point for web users, and the human-edited Yahoo Directory the most popular search engine, receiving 95 million page views per day, triple that of rival Excite. It also made many high-profile acquisitions. Yahoo began offering free e-mail from October 1997 after the acquisition of RocketMail, which was then renamed to Yahoo Mail. In 1998, Yahoo replaced AltaVista as the crawler-based search engine underlying the Directory with Inktomi. Yahoo's two biggest acquisitions were made in 1999: Geocities for $3.6 billion and Broadcast.com for $5.7 billion.

Its stock price skyrocketed during the dot-com bubble, closing at an all-time high of $118.75/share on January 3, 2000. However, after the dot-com bubble burst, it reached a post-bubble low of $8.11 on September 26, 2001.

Yahoo began using Google for search in June 2000. Over the next four years, it developed its own search technologies, which it began using in 2004 partly using technology from its $280 million acquisition of Inktomi in 2002. In response to Google's Gmail, Yahoo began to offer unlimited email storage in 2007. In 2008, the company laid off hundreds of people as it struggled from competition.

In February 2008, Microsoft made an unsolicited bid to acquire Yahoo for $44.6 billion. Yahoo rejected the bid, claiming that it "substantially undervalues" the company and was not in the interest of its shareholders. Although Microsoft increased its bid to $47 billion, Yahoo insisted on another 10%+ increase to the offer and Microsoft cancelled the offer in May 2008.

Carol Bartz, who had no previous experience in Internet advertising, replaced Yang as CEO in January 2009. In September 2011, after failing to meet targets, she was fired by chairman Roy J. Bostock; CFO Tim Morse was named as Interim CEO of the company.

In April 2012, after the appointment of Scott Thompson as CEO, several key executives resigned, including chief product officer Blake Irving. On April 4, 2012, Yahoo announced 2,000 layoffs, or about 14% of its 14,100 workers by the end of year, expected to save around $375 million annually. In an email sent to employees in April 2012, Thompson reiterated his view that customers should come first at Yahoo. He also completely reorganized the company.

On May 13, 2012, Thompson was fired and was replaced on an interim basis by Ross Levinsohn, recently appointed head of Yahoo's new Media group. Several associates of Third Point Management, including Daniel S. Loeb were nominated to the board of directors. Thompson's total compensation for his 130-day tenure with Yahoo was at least $7.3 million.

On July 15, 2012, Marissa Mayer was appointed president and CEO of Yahoo, effective July 17, 2012.

In June 2013, Yahoo acquired blogging site Tumblr for $1.1 billion in cash, with Tumblr's CEO and founder David Karp continuing to run the site. In July 2013, Yahoo announced plans to open an office in San Francisco.

On August 2, 2013, Yahoo acquired Rockmelt; its staff was retained, but all of its existing products were terminated.

Data collated by comScore during July 2013 revealed that, during the month, more people in the U.S. visited Yahoo websites than Google; the first time that Yahoo outperformed Google since 2011. The data did not count mobile usage, nor Tumblr.

Mayer also hired Katie Couric to be the anchor of a new online news operation and started an online food magazine. However, by January 2014, doubts about Mayer's progress emerged when Mayer fired her own first major hire, Henrique de Castro.

On December 12, 2014, Yahoo acquired video advertising provider BrightRoll for $583 million.

On November 21, 2014, Yahoo acquired Cooliris.

Decline, security breaches, and sale

By December 2015, Mayer was criticized as performance declined. Mayer was ranked as the least likable CEO in tech.

On February 2, 2016, Mayer announced layoffs amounting to 15% of the Yahoo! workforce.

On July 25, 2016, Verizon Communications announced the acquisition of Yahoo's core Internet business for $4.83 billion. The deal excluded Yahoo's 15% stake in Alibaba Group and 35.5% stake in Yahoo Japan.

On February 21, 2017, as a result of the Yahoo data breaches, Verizon lowered its purchase price for Yahoo by $350 million and reached an agreement to share liabilities regarding the data breaches.

On June 13, 2017, Verizon completed the acquisition of Yahoo and Marissa Mayer resigned.

Yahoo, AOL, and HuffPost were to continue operating under their own names, under the umbrella of a new company, Oath Inc., later called Verizon Media.

The parts of the original Yahoo! Inc. which were not purchased by Verizon Communications were renamed Altaba, which later liquidated, making a final distribution in October 2020.

In September 2021, investment funds managed by Apollo Global Management acquired 90% of Yahoo.

In November 2021, Yahoo announced that it was ceasing its operations in mainland China due to an increasingly challenging business and legal environment. Previously, the company has discontinued China Yahoo! Mail on August 20, 2013.

In 2023, Yahoo announced that it would be cutting 20% of its workforce. The move follows mass layoffs from other tech giants including Google, Microsoft, Twitter, Inc, Meta, and Amazon. The company is set to lay off roughly 1,000 staff members of their 8,600 workers.

Chief Executive Officers
Eleven chief executives and interim leaders have led the Yahoo companies since 1995. They are:
 Jim Lanzone, CEO of Yahoo Inc. (2021–present)
 Guru Gowrappan, CEO of Oath Inc., Verizon Media, and Yahoo (2018–2021)
 Tim Armstrong, CEO of Oath Inc. (2017–2018)
 Marissa Mayer (2012–2017)
 Ross Levinsohn Interim (2012)
 Scott Thompson (2012)
 Tim Morse Interim (2011–2012)
 Carol Bartz (2009–2011)
 Jerry Yang (2007–2009)
 Terry Semel (2001–2007)
 Timothy Koogle (1995–2001)

Products and services
For a list of all current and defunct services offered by Yahoo, see: List of Yahoo-owned sites and services.

Data breaches

On September 22, 2016, Yahoo disclosed a data breach that occurred in late 2014, in which information associated with at least 500 million user accounts, one of the largest breaches reported to date. The United States indicted four men, including two employees of Russia's Federal Security Service (FSB), for their involvement in the hack. On December 14, 2016, the company revealed that another separate data breach had occurred in 2014, with hackers obtaining sensitive account information, including security questions, to at least one billion accounts. The company stated that hackers had utilized stolen internal software to forge HTTP cookies.

On October 3, 2017, the company stated that all 3 billion of its user accounts were affected by the August 2013 theft.

Criticism

DMCA notice to whistleblower
On November 30, 2009, Yahoo was criticized by the Electronic Frontier Foundation for sending a DMCA notice to whistleblower website "Cryptome" for publicly posting details, prices, and procedures on obtaining private information pertaining to Yahoo's subscribers.

Censorship of private emails affiliated with Occupy Wall Street protests
After some concerns over censorship of private emails regarding a website affiliated with Occupy Wall Street protests were raised, Yahoo responded with an apology and explained it as an accident.

Partners and sponsorships

On September 11, 2001, Yahoo! announced its partnership with FIFA for the 2002 FIFA World Cup and 2006 FIFA World Cup tournaments. It was one of FIFA's 15 partners at the tournaments. The deal included co-branding the organization's websites.

Yahoo! sponsored the 2012 Sundance Film Festival.
NBC Sports Group aligned with Yahoo Sports the same year with content and program offerings on mobile and desktop platforms.

Yahoo announced television video partnerships in 2013 with Condé Nast, WWE, ABC NEWS, and CNBC. Yahoo entered into a 10-year collaboration in 2014, as a founding partner of Levi's Stadium, home of the San Francisco 49ers.

The National Basketball Association partnered with Yahoo Sports to stream games, offer virtual and augmented-reality fan experiences, and in 2018 NBA League Pass. Yahoo Sportsbook launched in November 2019, a collaboration with BetMGM.

BuzzFeed acquired HuffPost from Yahoo in November 2020, in a stock deal with Yahoo as a minority shareholder. The NFL partnered with Yahoo in 2020, to introduce a new "Watch Together" function on the Yahoo Sports app for interactive co-viewing through a synchronized livestream of local and primetime NFL games. The Paley Center for Media collaborated with Verizon Media to exclusively stream programs on Yahoo platforms beginning in 2020.

Yahoo became the main sponsor for the Pramac Racing team and the first title sponsor for the 2021 ESport/MotoGP Championship season. Yahoo, the official partner for the September 2021 New York Fashion Week event also unveiled sponsorship for the Rebecca Minkoff collection via a NFT space. In September 2021, it was announced that Yahoo partnered with Shopify, connecting the e-commerce merchants on Yahoo Finance, AOL and elsewhere.

See also
 List of Yahoo!-owned sites and services
 List of search engines
 Yahoo! litigation

References

External links

 
 Yahoo! Products and Services
 ALTABA and Yahoo! EDGAR Filing History

 
1994 establishments in California
2017 mergers and acquisitions
Companies based in Sunnyvale, California
Companies formerly listed on the Nasdaq
Companies in the PRISM network
Internet properties established in 1994
Multinational companies headquartered in the United States
Software companies based in California
Software companies of the United States
Technology companies based in the San Francisco Bay Area
Technology companies established in 1994
Telecommunications companies established in 1994